Procyliosoma is a genus of pill millipede found in Australia and New Zealand. Formerly classified in the family Sphaerotheriidae, in 2009  Procyliosoma was reclassified as the only genus in the family Procyliosomatidae.

Species
 Procyliosoma andersoni (Verhoeff, 1928) – New South Wales
 Procyliosoma aurivillii Silvestri, 1917 – Queensland
 Procyliosoma castaneum (Verhoeff, 1924) – Queensland
 Procyliosoma delacyi (White, 1859) – New Zealand
 Procyliosoma dorrigense (Verhoeff, 1928) – New South Wales
 Procyliosoma leae Silvestri, 1917 – Tasmania
 Procyliosoma leiosomum Hutton, 1877 – New Zealand
 Procyliosoma tasmanicum Silvestri, 1917 – Tasmania
 Procyliosoma tuberculatum Silvestri, 1917 – New Zealand
 Procyliosoma walesianum (Karsch, 1881) – New South Wales

References

Sphaerotheriida
Millipedes of Oceania
Millipede genera
Taxa named by Filippo Silvestri